Chuck Holmes may refer to:
 Chuck Holmes (ice hockey)
 Chuck Holmes (entrepreneur)

See also
 Charles Holmes (disambiguation)